In physics, a plane wave is a special case of wave or field: a physical quantity whose value, at any moment, is constant through any plane that is perpendicular to a fixed direction in space.  

For any position  in space and any time , the value of such a field can be written as

The values of the field  may be scalars, vectors, or any other physical or mathematical quantity.  They can be complex numbers, as in a complex exponential plane wave.  

Special types

Traveling plane wave

Often the term "plane wave" refers specifically to a traveling plane wave, whose evolution in time can be described as simple translation of the field at a constant wave speed  along the direction perpendicular to the wavefronts.  Such a field can be written as  

where  is now a function of a single real parameter , that describes the "profile" of the wave, namely the value of the field at time , for each displacement . In that case,  is called the direction of propagation. This plane travels along the direction of propagation  with velocity ; and the value of the field is then the same, and constant in time, at every one of its points.

Sinusoidal plane wave

The term is also used, even more specifically, to mean a "monochromatic" or sinusoidal plane wave: a travelling plane wave whose profile is a sinusoidal function.  That is,

The parameter , which may be a scalar or a vector, is called the amplitude of the wave; the scalar coefficient  is its "spatial frequency"; and the scalar  is its "phase".

A true plane wave cannot physically exist, because it would have to fill all space.  Nevertheless, the plane wave model is important and widely used in physics. The waves emitted by any source with finite extent into a large homogeneous region of space can be well approximated by plane waves when viewed over any part of that region that is sufficiently small compared to its distance from the source.  That is the case, for example, of the light waves from a distant star that arrive at a telescope.

Plane standing wave 

A standing wave is a field whose value can be expressed as the product of two functions, one depending only on position, the other only on time.  A plane standing wave, in particular, can be expressed as

Then  will be the maximum field magnitude seen at the point .

Properties

A plane wave can be studied by ignoring the directions perpendicular to the direction vector ; that is, by considering the function  as a wave in a one-dimensional medium. 

Any local operator, linear or not, applied to a plane wave yields a plane wave.  Any linear combination of plane waves with the same normal vector  is also a plane wave.

The divergence of a vector-valued plane wave depends only on the projection of the vector  in the direction . Specifically,

See also 

Plane wave expansion
Rectilinear propagation
Wave equation
Weyl expansion

References

Sources

Wave mechanics
Planes (geometry)